The 1962 All-Ireland Senior Football Championship Final was the 75th All-Ireland Final and the deciding match of the 1962 All-Ireland Senior Football Championship, an inter-county Gaelic football tournament for the top teams in Ireland.

This marked the first occasion on which the final was televised.

Pre-match
Roscommon played Sligo in the 1962 Connacht final and were behind for much of the match. Sligo were blighted by a sudden string of injuries, missed a 50 while two points ahead in the final minute, and then gifted soon-to-be All-Ireland finalists Roscommon a goal, allowing them to progress at Sligo's expense in what is considered "one of the great football tragedies in Connacht".

Match summary
Garry McMahon scored a goal for Kerry after 35 seconds and Kerry hit a point quickly after, and victory was never in doubt. McMahon's goal was the fastest in All-Ireland Senior Football Championship Final history. Until Garristown man Dean Rock scored for Dublin against Mayo in the 2020 final.

References

External links
, a British Pathé newsreel of the game

All-Ireland Senior Football Championship Final
All-Ireland Senior Football Championship Final, 1962
All-Ireland Senior Football Championship Finals
All-Ireland Senior Football Championship Finals
Kerry county football team matches
Roscommon county football team matches